Joseph Gladden House is a historic home located in East Fallowfield Township, Chester County, Pennsylvania. It was built about 1800, and is a two-story, two bay, stuccoed stone Penn Plan dwelling.  Two additions were built on the rear of the house.

It was added to the National Register of Historic Places in 1985.

References

Houses on the National Register of Historic Places in Pennsylvania
Houses completed in 1800
Houses in Chester County, Pennsylvania
National Register of Historic Places in Chester County, Pennsylvania